George Frank Knew (13 October 1920 – 17 February 1995) was an English cricketer.  Knew was a right-handed batsman, though his bowling style is unknown.  He was born at Wigston, Leicestershire.

Knew made his first-class cricket debut for Leicestershire against Oxford University in 1939.  He made four further first-class appearances in the 1939 season, the last of which came against Sussex.  In his five first-class matches, he scored 78 runs at an average of 9.75, with a high score of 42.  He bowled 200 balls in first-class cricket, taking the wicket of Sussex batsman James Langridge.

His son, George Knew junior, also played first-class cricket for Leicestershire.  Knew died at Leicester on 17 February 1995.

References

External links
George Knew at ESPNcricinfo
George Knew at CricketArchive

1920 births
1995 deaths
People from Wigston Magna
Cricketers from Leicestershire
English cricketers
Leicestershire cricketers